Parthenium or Parthenion was a town of ancient Mysia near ancient Pergamum.

Its site is tentatively located near Eski Bergama, Asiatic Turkey.

References

Populated places in ancient Mysia
Former populated places in Turkey